The Accusing Finger is a 1936 American drama film directed by James P. Hogan and written by Madeleine Ruthven, Brian Marlow, John Bright and Robert Tasker. The film stars Paul Kelly, Marsha Hunt, Kent Taylor, Robert Cummings, Harry Carey, Bernadene Hayes and Joe Sawyer. The film was released on October 23, 1936, by Paramount Pictures.

Premise
An attorney is proud of sending many people to jail, some of whom were innocent. His wife is killed, and due to circumstantial evidence, he is sent to jail and finds himself with many of the people he prosecuted.

Cast 

Paul Kelly as Douglas Goodwin
Marsha Hunt as Claire Patterson
Kent Taylor as Jerry Welch
Robert Cummings as Jimmy Ellis
Harry Carey as Sen. Nash
Bernadene Hayes as Muriel Goodwin
Joe Sawyer as Father Reed 
DeWitt Jennings as Prison Warden
Russell Hicks as Sen. Forrest
Jonathan Hale as Special Prosecutor
Ellen Drew as Wife
Rollo Lloyd as Dr. Simms
Paul Fix as John 'Twitchy' Burke
Sam Flint as Dist. Atty. Benton
Ralf Harolde as 'Spud'
Fred Kohler as Johnson
Hilda Vaughn as Maid
George Chandler as Reporter

References

External links 
 

1936 films
1930s English-language films
American drama films
1936 drama films
Paramount Pictures films
American black-and-white films
Films directed by James Patrick Hogan
1930s American films